The Yangjiazhangzi mine is one of the largest molybdenum mines in China. The mine is located in north-east China in Liaoning. The Metrekskoye mine has reserves amounting to 22.8 million tonnes of molybdenum ore grading 0.15% molybdenum thus resulting 32,145 tonnes of molybdenum.

See also
List of molybdenum mines

References 

Molybdenum mines in China